The Lincoln Park Public Schools are a community public school district that serves students in pre-kindergarten through eighth grade from Lincoln Park, in Morris County, New Jersey, United States.

As of the 2018–19 school year, the district, comprised of two schools, had an enrollment of 914 students and 82.4 classroom teachers (on an FTE basis), for a student–teacher ratio of 11.1:1.

The district is classified by the New Jersey Department of Education as being in District Factor Group "FG", the fourth-highest of eight groupings. District Factor Groups organize districts statewide to allow comparison by common socioeconomic characteristics of the local districts. From lowest socioeconomic status to highest, the categories are A, B, CD, DE, FG, GH, I and J.

For ninth through twelfth grades, Lincoln Park public school students attend Boonton High School in Boonton as part of a sending/receiving relationship with the Boonton Public Schools, with Lincoln Park students accounting for a majority of students at the high school. As of the 2018–19 school year, the high school had an enrollment of 643 students and 56.3 classroom teachers (on an FTE basis), for a student–teacher ratio of 11.4:1. The two districts have sought to sever the more-than-50-year-old relationship, citing cost savings that could be achieved by both districts and complaints by Lincoln Park that it is granted only one seat on the Boonton Public Schools' Board of Education, less than the number of seats that would be allocated based on the percentage of students of population. In April 2006, the Commissioner of the New Jersey Department of Education rejected the request. As of 2015-16 there were about 70 students from the borough attending the academy programs of the Morris County Vocational School District, which are the Morris County School of Technology in Denville; The Academy for Mathematics, Science, and Engineering in Rockaway at Morris Hills High School; and the Academy for Law and Public Safety in Butler at Butler High School.

Schools
Schools in the district (with 2018–19 enrollment data from the National Center for Education Statistics) are:
Elementary school
Lincoln Park Elementary School with 488 students in grades PreK-4
Melissa Flach-Bammer, Principal
Middle school
Lincoln Park Middle School with 421 students in grades 5-8
Michael Meyer, Superintendent

Administration
Core members of the district's administration are:
Michael Meyer, Principal
Nicole C. Schoening, Business Administrator / Board Secretary

Board of education
The district's board of education, comprised of seven members, sets policy and oversees the fiscal and educational operation of the district through its administration. As a Type II school district, the board's trustees are elected directly by voters to serve three-year terms of office on a staggered basis, with either two or three seats up for election each year held (since 2012) as part of the November general election. The board appoints a superintendent to oversee the day-to-day operation of the district.

References

External links
Lincoln Park Public Schools
 
School Data for the Lincoln Park Public Schools, National Center for Education Statistics

Lincoln Park, New Jersey
New Jersey District Factor Group FG
School districts in Morris County, New Jersey